Turnabout Ridge is a high, rugged ridge, 10 nautical miles (18 km) long, lying between Linehan and Lowery Glaciers in the Queen Elizabeth Range. So named by the Ohio State University party to the Queen Alexandra Range (1966–67) because the ridge was the farthest point from Base Camp reached by the party.

Ridges of the Ross Dependency
Shackleton Coast